Geoffrey Ross Pyatt (born November 16, 1963) is a United States diplomat serving as Assistant Secretary of State for Energy Resources. He was previously United States Ambassador to Greece and Ukraine. Pyatt's career in the U.S. State Department has led to posts in Asia, Europe, and Central America.

Early life and education
Pyatt was born in La Jolla, a suburb of San Diego, California, the son of Kedar “Bud” Pyatt, and Mary Mackenzie.  He received a bachelor's degree in political studies in 1985 at the University of California, Irvine, and a master's degree in international relations at Yale University in 1987.

Career
Pyatt started his diplomatic career in Honduras from 1990 until 1992 as vice-consul and economic officer in Tegucigalpa. He was deputy chief of diplomatic mission in India in 2006 and 2007. After that he worked as deputy chief of U.S. mission to International Atomic Energy Agency and other international organizations in Vienna. Pyatt served as Principal Deputy Assistant Secretary of the Bureau of South and Central Asian Affairs from May 2010 until July 2013.

Pyatt took the Oath of Office of United States Ambassador to Ukraine on July 30, 2013 in the Harry S Truman Building of the US State Department in Washington, D.C. Ukrainian President Viktor Yanukovych accepted Pyatt's credentials on August 15, 2013. After his appointment, Pyatt started actively studying the Ukrainian language. On October 15, 2013 Pyatt attended an international conference on fighting anti-Semitism in Kyiv, but could not address the audience at the event due to the United States federal government shutdown of 2013.

Pyatt became part of a diplomatic scandal in January 2014, when his conversation with the Assistant Secretary of State for European and Eurasian Affairs at the United States Department of State, Victoria Nuland, was apparently intercepted and uploaded to YouTube. The conversation included Nuland saying "Fuck the EU", which were harshly criticized by the President of the European Council Herman van Rompuy and by German Chancellor Angela Merkel. Pyatt and Nuland also discussed who they thought should be included in or excluded from Ukraine's new post-Maidan government and possible ways to influence the unfolding political process within Ukraine, specifically mentioning that then-Vice President Joe Biden would be helpful in that regard. Pyatt was dismissive of Vitali Klitschko. saying "let him stay out and do his political homework and stuff I'm just thinking in terms of sort of the process moving ahead we want to keep the moderate democrats together". He further said "we want to try to get somebody with an international personality to come out here and help to midwife this thing". This led to speculation in Russia and in the United States that the U.S. Government was interfering with Ukraine's sovereignty. 

Pyatt supported the 2014 Ukrainian revolution against Ukraine's President Victor Yanukovych. Pyatt characterised pro-Russian separatist rebels in Donetsk and Luhansk as "terrorists".

On September 25, 2015, during his speech at Odesa Financial Forum, Pyatt criticized Ukrainian Prosecutor's office.

On May 19, 2016, he was nominated by U.S. President Barack Obama to serve as United States Ambassador to Greece. He was replaced by Marie L. Yovanovitch in Ukraine. He was confirmed as the Ambassador to Greece on July 14, 2016. He was sworn in September 2016. He presented his credentials on October 24, 2016. He served in the post for 5 years until his resignation in 2022.

On April 22, 2022, President Joe Biden nominated Pyatt to the position of Assistant Secretary of State for Energy Resources. The Senate confirmed his nomination on September 15, 2022, and he was sworn in on September 19.

Personal life
Pyatt speaks Spanish.

See also
List of current ambassadors of the United States

References

External links

Official website of the US embassy in Ukraine
Biography on the official website of the US State Department

|-

1963 births
United States Assistant Secretaries of State
Ambassadors of the United States to Greece
Ambassadors of the United States to Ukraine
Living people
People from La Jolla, San Diego
University of California, Irvine alumni
Yale University alumni
21st-century American diplomats
Biden administration personnel